The Women's 10 kilometre classical at the FIS Nordic World Ski Championships 2009 was held on 19 February 2009 at 11:30 CET. A 5 km qualifying event took place on 18 February.

Organizing Committee chair Katerina Neumannová of the Czech Republic is two-time defending champion, but retired after the 2006–07 season. The top ten finishers of the 5 km event advanced to the 10 km event on the 19th. Saarinen won her first individual gold medal as a follow-up to her relay gold medal at the previous championships in Sapporo, leading at all time marks. Longa and Kowalczyk both earned their first medals at the championships. The top three 5 km qualifiers, Smyth, Li and Kashiwabara, finished 51st, 55th, and did not start respectively.

Results

References

External links
Final results (FIS)

FIS Nordic World Ski Championships 2009
2009 in women's sport